

A
 Adhalgaon
 Adhorewadi
 Ajnuj
 Anandwadi
 Arangaon Dumala
 Arvi
 Angare

B
 Baburdi
 Ban Pimpri
 Bangarda
 Belwandi Bk.
 Belwandi Kothar
 Bhangaon
 Bhaudi
 Bori
 Bhingan Khalsa
 Bhingan Dumala

C
 Chorachiwadi
 Chambhurdi
 Chimbhale
 Chandgaon
chikhali

D
 Deodaithan 
 Deulgaon
 Dhawalgaon (Dhavalgaon)
 Dhoraja  (Khandobachi vadi)

E
 Erondali

G
 Gar
 Gavanwadi
 Ghargaon
 Ghodegaon
 Ghogargaon
 Ghotavi
 Ghugalwadgaon
 Ghutewadi

H
 Hangewadi
 Hinganidumala
 Hirdgaon

K
 Kamthi
 Kashti
 Kautha
 Khandgaon
 Kolgaon
 Kondeghavan
 Koregaon
 Koregavhan
 Kosegavhan
 Kothul

L
 Limpangaon
 Loni Vyanknath

Madhevadgaon
 Madhevadgaon
 Mahadevwadi
 Mandavgaon
 Math
 Mhase
 Mhatar Pimpri
 Mungasgaon
 Mote Wadi (Pargaon Sudrik)
 Malwadi-Ajnuj
mundhekarwadi

N
 Nimbhavi
 Nimgaon Khalu
 Narodewasti
 Nandur Mdhmeshwar

P
 Pargaon Sudrik
 Pedgaon
 Pimpalgaon Pisa
 Pimpri Kolandar
 Pisore Khand (Pohi Phata)
 Pisore Budruk (Yelpane)
 pimpalgaon Bsvant

R
 Raighavan
 Rajapur
 Ruikhel

S
 Sanghvi Dumala
 Sarola Somanvanshi
 Shedgaon
 Shirasgaon Bodhaka
 Suregaon
 Surodi
 Shrisakhar

T
 Takali kadewalit 
 Takali Lonar
 Tandali Dumala
 Tardghavhan
 Thetesanghvi

U
 Ukkadgaon

 Ukkhalgaon

V
 Vadali
 Wangadari
 Velu
 Visapur

w
 Wadgaon

Y
 Yelpane
 Yevati

See also
 Shrigonda tehsil
 Tehsils in Ahmednagar
 Villages in Akole tehsil
 Villages in Jamkhed tehsil
 Villages in Karjat tehsil
 Villages in Kopargaon tehsil
 Villages in Nagar tehsil
 Villages in Nevasa tehsil
 Villages in Parner tehsil
 Villages in Pathardi tehsil
 Villages in Rahata tehsil
 Villages in Rahuri tehsil
 Villages in Sangamner tehsil
 Villages in Shevgaon tehsil
 Villages in Shrirampur tehsil

References

 
Shrigonda